Pyrenophora avenae is a species of fungus in the family Pleosporaceae. It is a plant pathogen, causing leaf stripe, blotch or spot and seedling blight of oats.

References 

Pyrenophora
Fungal plant pathogens and diseases
Oats diseases
Fungi described in 1930